Delphi 2&3, Solo Piano Improvisations is a double album recorded by Chick Corea and released in 1980.

Track listing 
All music composed by Chick Corea.

Delphi 2 Side One
"New World I" – 1:02
"New World II" – 0:40
"New World III" – 1:26
"New World IV" – 1:08
"New World V" – 1:25
"New World VI" – 1:01
"Sad Song" – 9:17
"Samba" – 2:36
"North Brazil" – 3:20

Delphi 2 Side Two
"Mountain Top" – 6:39
"Voices" – 2:41
"Spirits" - 7:03
"Waltze for my Folks" – 4:48
"Unicorns I" – 2:17
"Unicorns II" – 2:17

Delphi 3 Side One
"Mime I" – 3:58
"Mime II" – 4:48
"Ballet I" - 2:37
"Ballet II" - 0:38
"Ballet III" - 2:59
"Ballet IV" - 1:08
"Ballet V" - 0:32
"Ballet VI" - 1:48
"Ballet VII" - 0:31
"Ballet VIII" - 0:25
"Ballet IX" - 0:20
"Ballet X" - 0:53
"Ballet XI" - 0:40
"Ballet XII" - 0:38
"Poem I (Home)" - 3:53

Delphi 3 Side Two
"Concerto Flamenco" - 11:08
"Poem II (Liana)" - 3:17
"Poem III (Thaddeus)" - 3:26
"Poem IV (Remember the Hearts)" - 4:46
"Poem V (Remember the Hearts)" - 3:11

Personnel 
 Chick Corea – piano

See also 
 Delphi I (Polydor, 1979)

References 

1980 albums
Chick Corea albums
Polydor Records albums